Barre Sangarsh Samuha ( "Barre Struggle Group") was a communist faction in Barre, Nepal. The group emerged in the early 1980s, after breaking off from the Communist Party of Nepal (Pushpa Lal). It subsequently merged into the Communist Party of Nepal (Marxist-Leninist).

Sources
Rawal, Bhim Bahadur. Nepalma samyabadi andolan: udbhab ra vikas. Kathmandu: Pairavi Prakashan. Chart nr. 1.

Defunct communist parties in Nepal
1980s establishments in Nepal